The anime series Eyeshield 21 is based on the manga series of the same name written by Riichiro Inagaki and illustrated by Yusuke Murata. The series is directed by Masayoshi Nishida and produced by TV Tokyo, NAS and Gallop The plot of the episodes follows Sena Kobayakawa, a student who becomes an American football player against his desire but eventually becomes the star of the team, wearing an eyeshield to protect his identity.

Episodes 1 between 72 of Eyeshield 21 aired from April 6, 2005 to August 30, 2006 on TV Tokyo. The episodes were later released in eighteen DVD compilations between July 22, 2005 and December 22, 2006 by Bandai Visual.

The episodes use seven pieces of theme music: three opening and four ending themes. The opening themes are "Breakthrough" by Coming Century, used for the first thirty-five episodes, "Innocence" by 20th Century, used between episode 36 and 64, with the rest using "Dang Dang" by ZZ. The ending themes are "Be Free" by Ricken's, for the first thirteen episodes, "Blaze Away" by The Trax, from episode 14 to 35, and "Goal" by Beni Arashiro and "Run to Win" by Aya Hirano, Miyu Irino, Koichi Nagano and Kappei Yamaguchi, used for the episodes 36 to 64 and remaining episodes respectively.

Episode list

References

1-72